David Judd Nutting (December 26, 1930 – September 23, 2020) was an industrial design engineer who played a role in the early video game industry. He was a graduate of the Pratt Institute with a degree in industrial design.

Career
After leaving the Army Corps of Engineers, Nutting joined the design firm of Brooks Stevens Associates. During his time there he was involved in a wide variety of projects, working on everything from Evinrude Outboard Motors, Mirro cookware, Bolens tractors, Studebaker, and 3M. For Willys, Nutting designed Jeep Grand Wagoneer, and went on to design the Enstrom Helicopter.

In 1967 Dave Nutting became involved in the coin-operated games industry through his operation Nutting Industries selling the I.Q. Computer (1967) which he co-designed with engineer Harold Montgomery. The quiz machine used a film-strip to display various questions and answers which participants would select to accrue score. Through the next few years Nutting would update this technology to create electro-mechanical arcade games like Red Baron (1970). In 1971 he started a new enterprise, Milwaukee Coin Industries (MCI), continuing the design and manufacturing of arcade amusements as well as opening Red Baron Amusement Centers around the country.

In 1974, Nutting and fellow MCI engineer Jeff Frederiksen started Dave Nutting Associates to serve as a contractor for new arcade game concepts. The two learned about Intel's new microprocessor chip set and decided to integrate this technology into a pinball machine, convincing Intel to provide them with one of the first development kits for the Intel 4040. They integrated the microprocessor into a Flicker (1975) pinball machine provided by Bally Manufacturing. This scheme was later patented by the duo as the first microprocessor pinball design. Bally acquired the patents to their solution, but did not produce a product based on this design. They began producing solid-state pinballs in 1976 with the Night Rider (1976) table and became the predominant pinball company in the industry. The patents became the subject of a patent infringement lawsuit against other pinball makers, primarily D. Gottlieb & Co and Williams Electronics.

Wishing to expand into video games with this technology, Nutting hired two students from the University of Wisconsin named Jamie Fenton and Tom McHugh to work on video game software. This team developed a video game hardware system which was first used on the game Gun Fight (1975) released by Midway Manufacturing. Bally later purchased Dave Nutting Associates with David Nutting retaining the head position. Other video games produced by the company included Sea Wolf (1976), Bally Pin (1979), Wizard of Wor (1980), Robby Roto (1981), Baby Pac-Man (1982) (combining pinball and video) and Gorf (1981). In 1984, Bally closed Dave Nutting Associates, following the video game crash of 1983.

After his involvement with arcade video games, David Nutting continued in engineering. He wrote two books, Language of Nature: Quantum World Revealed (2005) dealing with quantum mechanics and Secrets of a Creative Mind (2012) a creative motivational book.

Nutting died at his home in Green Valley, Arizona, on September 23, 2020.

References

 "David Judd Nutting", Xlibris

1930 births
2020 deaths
American video game designers
Pinball game designers
Pratt Institute alumni